The 2014–15 Illinois Fighting Illini women's basketball team will represent University of Illinois at Urbana–Champaign during the 2014–15 NCAA Division I women's basketball season. The Fighting Illini, led by third year head coach Matt Bollant, play their home games at the State Farm Center and were members of the Big Ten Conference. They finished the season 15–16, 6–12 in Big Ten play to finish in tenth place. They lost in the second round of the Big Ten women's tournament to Nebraska.

2014–15 Roster

Schedule

|-
!colspan=9 style="background:#FF6600; color:#003C7D;"| Exhibition

|-
!colspan=9 style="background:#FF6600; color:#003C7D;"| Non-conference regular season

|-
!colspan=9 style="background:#FF6600; color:#003C7D;"| Big Ten regular season

|-
!colspan=9 style="background:#FF6600; color:#003C7D;"| Big Ten Women's tournament

Source

See also
2014–15 Illinois Fighting Illini men's basketball team

References

Illinois Fighting Illini women's basketball seasons
Illinois
Illinois Fighting Illini women's basket
Illinois Fighting Illini women's basket